Khaled Al-Samiri (born 1 January 1997) is a Saudi Arabian footballer who plays as a midfielder for Al-Khaleej on loan from Al-Ittihad in the Saudi Professional League.

Club career
On 27 January 2020, Al-Samiri joined Al-Faisaly on loan from Al-Ittihad on a six-month deal.

On 27 August 2022, Al-Samiri joined Al-Khaleej on loan.

International career
Al-Samiri played his first international game with the Saudi Arabia Under-20 on 28 December 2017 against Senegal (0–2), in the 2017 FIFA U-20 World Cup.

Honours
Al-Ittihad
Saudi Crown Prince Cup: 2016–17
King Cup: 2018

Al-Faisaly
King Cup: 2020–21

References

External links
 

Living people
1997 births
Saudi Arabian footballers
Saudi Arabia international footballers
Ittihad FC players
Al-Faisaly FC players
Khaleej FC players
Saudi Professional League players
Association football midfielders